This article lists Scottish football attendance records under the categories listed below. The highest ever attendance for a UEFA competition match was in the 1969–70 European Cup semi-final at Hampden Park, Scotland's national stadium. A record 136,505 people attended the match between Celtic and Leeds United. The attendance of 149,415 for the Scotland vs. England international match of 1937 at Hampden Park is also a European record. The attendance of 147,365 for the 1937 Scottish Cup Final between Celtic and Aberdeen at Hampden Park is a European record for a club match. Rangers' record attendance of 118,567 at Ibrox is a British record for a league match.

By club

Current SPFL member clubs
This is a list of all 42 Scottish Professional Football League clubs' record match attendances at their home ground. The vast majority of these records were achieved before the advent of all-seater stadia. The cost of building all-seater grounds, and a general decline in attendances, means the present capacities of the clubs stadiums are well below their record attendances. Some records were achieved at a club's previous ground, rather than their current location. For example, Clyde's record was set at Shawfield Stadium, whilst they have since moved to Broadwood Stadium. Records set while ground-sharing or at a venue other than the club's home stadium are not included. For example, Celtic were the home team when 136,505 attended their 1969–70 European Cup semi-final second leg match against Leeds United, but the match was played at Hampden Park, not Celtic Park. Rangers' record attendance of 118,567 is also the British record for a league match.

Former SPFL member clubs

Cup finals
The attendance of 147,365 for the 1937 Scottish Cup Final between Celtic and Aberdeen at Hampden Park is a European record for a club match.

The attendance of 136,274 for the 1952 Scottish Cup Final between Motherwell and Dundee is a Scottish record for a match not involving Celtic, Rangers or the Scotland national team.

While less than 50% of the all-time record crowds at Hampden, the attendance of 72,069 at the 1989 Scottish Cup Final has become a landmark figure as no match in Scotland has come close to matching it since, owing to subsequent stadium modernisation which left no venue with a greater capacity.

Scotland national team

This section lists the top ten attendances for the Scotland national team in home matches. The attendance of 149,415 for the Scotland vs. England match of 1937 at Hampden Park is a European record.

Outwith Scotland fixtures, an exhibition match between Great Britain and the Rest of the World in 1947 attracted a crowd quoted as up to 137,000.

European football

The attendance of 136,505 for the 1969–70 European Cup semi-final second leg between Celtic and Leeds United played at Hampden Park is the highest ever for a UEFA competition match.

The crowd of 127,621 at the 1960 European Cup Final (Real Madrid 7–3 Eintracht Frankfurt) remains the record for any UEFA competition final. The highest attendance at a final involving a Scottish club (they have been involved in 11, including two in the UEFA Super Cup) was the home leg of the 1961 European Cup Winners' Cup Final (Rangers 0–2 Fiorentina), when 80,000 attended Ibrox Park.

See also
List of football stadiums in Scotland
Record home attendances of English football clubs
Scottish stadium moves

Notes

References

 
 
Attendance records
Lists of association football stadiums in Scotland
Scotland